Wellington Bruno da Silva is a Brazilian footballer who plays as an attacking midfielder for São Bento. He has previously played in Campeonato Brasileiro Série A for Flamengo and Criciúma, and in Campeonato Brasileiro Série B for Ipatinga, Joinville and ABC. He has also played in Thai League 1 for Chiangrai United.

References

External links
 
 

Living people
1986 births
Brazilian footballers
Association football midfielders
Esporte Clube XV de Novembro (Jaú) players
Esporte Clube Noroeste players
Associação Atlética Internacional (Limeira) players
União São João Esporte Clube players
Comercial Futebol Clube (Ribeirão Preto) players
Alagoinhas Atlético Clube players
Centro Sportivo Alagoano players
América Futebol Clube (Teófilo Otoni) players
Ipatinga Futebol Clube players
CR Flamengo footballers
Associação Atlética Ponte Preta players
Joinville Esporte Clube players
Botafogo Futebol Clube (SP) players
Criciúma Esporte Clube players
Clube Atlético Penapolense players
ABC Futebol Clube players
Wellington Bruno
Wellington Bruno
Wellington Bruno
Associação Ferroviária de Esportes players
Campeonato Brasileiro Série A players
Campeonato Brasileiro Série B players
Wellington Bruno
People from Guarulhos
Footballers from São Paulo (state)